Returning to Shakespeare  is a non-fiction book written by Brian Vickers the literary scholar, and published by Routledge, London, in 1989. The book's main focus is a collection of previously published critical essays by Vickers pertaining to Shakespeare. The book is also prefaced with an extensive autobiographical sketch that details Vickers' evolution within Shakespearean scholarship.

References

External links 

Shakespearean scholarship
British non-fiction books
1989 non-fiction books
Literary theory
Literary criticism